Frederick Bamford Worden (September 4, 1894 – November 9, 1941) was an American professional baseball pitcher. He appeared in one game in Major League Baseball for the Philadelphia Athletics during the 1914 season.

References

Major League Baseball pitchers
Philadelphia Athletics players
Baseball players from St. Louis
1894 births
1941 deaths